John Collin may refer to:

 John Collin (actor) (1931–1987), British actor
 John F. Collin (1802–1889), American politician